Heemsen is a municipality in the district of Nienburg, in Lower Saxony, Germany. It is situated approximately 8 km northeast of Nienburg, and 25 km south of Verden.

Heemsen is part of the Samtgemeinde ("collective municipality") Heemsen.

References

Nienburg (district)